László Klinga (born 9 July 1947) is a Hungarian wrestler. He was born in Győr-Moson-Sopron County. He was Olympic bronze medalist in Freestyle wrestling in 1972.

References

External links 
 
 

1947 births
Living people
Sportspeople from Győr-Moson-Sopron County
Olympic wrestlers of Hungary
Wrestlers at the 1972 Summer Olympics
Wrestlers at the 1976 Summer Olympics
Hungarian male sport wrestlers
Olympic bronze medalists for Hungary
Olympic medalists in wrestling
Medalists at the 1972 Summer Olympics
20th-century Hungarian people
21st-century Hungarian people